The Run the World Tour was a concert tour by the American hip hop duo Run the Jewels, in support of their album Run the Jewels 3 (2016). The tour began on January 11, 2017 in Philadelphia, Pennsylvania and finished on November 16, 2017 in Glasgow, Scotland. Initial shows were announced in North America on November 1, 2016 and thereafter extended to Europe in March 2017.

Background 
On November 1, 2016, Run the Jewels announced on social media that they would be going on tour, additionally releasing the dates for the first leg. The tour would be initially going around the United States and Canada at 33 locations, which would begin on January 11, 2017 in Philadelphia, Pennsylvania and end on February 25, 2017 in New York City. The tour was to concur in support with the duo's then-upcoming album Run the Jewels 3, and would feature Cuz Lightyear, The Gaslamp Killer, and Spark Master Tape for the opening acts. General ticket sales for the tour began on November 4, 2016. Extended touring dates were added after the announcement and early during the tour itself.

On January 3, 2017, El-P announced Gangsta Boo and Nick Hook would be joining the tour. On January 11, 2017, the duo announced a spring European tour starting in United Kingdom and ending in Denmark for March, April, and June with tickets going up on January 20. On June 20, 2017, the duo announced additional dates for North America and Europe for October and November, with pre-sale tickets beginning on June 14, 2017. Additionally, Denzel Curry and Cuz Lightyear would be joining the North American dates while Danny Brown would join the European dates. On June 23, 2017, the duo announced extended touring dates for the United Kingdom for November.

Critical reception 
Both the North American and European legs of the tour have generally received positive reviews. For the Miami New Times, Angel Melendez reviewing the Miami concert voiced that "The interplay between El-P and Killer Mike is flawless. They weave in and out of each other’s verses and have even perfected a bit of choreography, bouncing and hopping in sync to the rhythm of each other’s words". David Harris of Spectrum Culture commented that although "Run the Jewels is different than most rap music because it keeps it political" keeping away from other topics and "Energy aside, it’s difficult to call the concert a success. When the booming bass and strobing lights undercut the most important thing, the music...". Mark Beaumont of The Guardian rated the duo's performance four out of five stars, expressing "Their cool-cop/goofball-cop act is perfectly, and powerfully, weighted. ... Joking aside, RTJ are the hip-hop clowns becoming politico princes."

Set list 
This set list is for the show on January 11, 2017 in Philadelphia, Pennsylvania. It is not representative of all concerts for the duration of the tour.

"Talk to Me"
"Legend Has It"
"Call Ticketron"
"Blockbuster Night, Part 1"
"Oh My Darling Don't Cry"
"Nobody Speak" (DJ Shadow cover)
"Hey Kids"
"Stay Gold"
"Don't Get Captured"
"Panther Like a Panther"
"Everybody Stay Calm"
"Love Again (Akinyele Back)"
"Lie, Cheat, Steal"
"Early"
"A Report to the Shareholders"
"Close Your Eyes (And Count to Fuck)"
"Down"
Encore
"Kill Your Masters"
"Run the Jewels"

Shows

Notes

References

External links
Run the Jewels Tour

2017 concert tours